Gâdinți is a commune in Neamț County, Western Moldavia, Romania. It is composed of a single village, Gâdinți. This was part of Sagna Commune until 2004, when it was split off.

References

Communes in Neamț County
Localities in Western Moldavia